Bruno Valentini (born 29 May 1955 in Colle di Val d'Elsa) is an Italian politician.

Valentini started his political career in Siena and then as a municipal councillor in Monteriggioni, Tuscany, in 1995. He served as Mayor of Monteriggioni from 2004 to 2013. He has been a member of the Democratic Party since 2007.

Valentini was elected Mayor of Siena on 11 June 2013. He ran for a second term at the 2018 Italian local elections, but was defeated by the centre-right candidate Luigi De Mossi.

References

See also
2013 Italian local elections
2018 Italian local elections
List of mayors of Siena

1955 births
Living people
Mayors of Siena
Democratic Party (Italy) politicians
Democrats of the Left politicians